The King's Representative is the formal title given to the viceregal representative of , as  of New Zealand, in the Cook Islands. The office of King's Representative is established by the Constitution of the Cook Islands. They are appointed by the King for a term of three years, and may be reappointed.  When New Zealand has a queen regnant, the viceroy is titled Queen's Representative.

The King's Representative fills the role normally filled by a Governor-General in the Westminster system of a Commonwealth realm, being both a representative of the monarch and the titular head of executive government. They appoint the Prime Minister and Cabinet and chair the Cook Islands Executive Council. In performing their duties, they must act on advice.

Originally these duties were performed by the High Commissioner of New Zealand to the Cook Islands, but in 1982 these powers were repatriated. The Governor-General of New Zealand still represents the King in matters pertaining to the entire Realm.

Following the death of Elizabeth II, the office formally became known as the "King's Representative".

List of Sovereign's Representatives in the Cook Islands

See also

 Monarchy in the Cook Islands

References

Gubernatorial titles
Politics of the Cook Islands
Main